Lament for a Maker is a 1938 detective novel by the British writer Michael Innes. It is the third in his series featuring John Appleby, a young Detective Inspector in the Metropolitan Police. It was published during the Golden Age of Detective Fiction. The title refers to the Lament for the Makaris by the Scottish poet William Dunbar, which is constantly recited by one of the characters. The novel features a string of first person narratives of the events that takes place, which each character drawing a conclusion that builds on and also corrects the previous writer.

Synopsis
In the Highlands of Scotland around the ancient but lonely Erchany Castle, strange happenings have occurred which alarm the local inhabitants culminating in the death by falling off the tower by the castle's miserly, reclusive owner. Suspicion for his murder seems to fall on a local man, whose family have a long-standing feud with the dead man, and who was about to elope with his daughter. The arrival of an Edinburgh lawyer and a Scotland Yard man both throw doubt on this easy solution, as the case seems to have it roots in events that took place in Australia forty years before involving the dead man's brother. Yet it proves so complex that even they take wrong turning before the truth is eventually reached.

References

Bibliography
 Hubin, Allen J. Crime Fiction, 1749–1980: A Comprehensive Bibliography. Garland Publishing, 1984.
 Reilly, John M. Twentieth Century Crime & Mystery Writers. Springer, 2015.
 Scheper, George L. Michael Innes. Ungar, 1986.

1938 British novels
British mystery novels
British crime novels
Novels by Michael Innes
Novels set in Scotland
Novels set in Liverpool
British detective novels
Victor Gollancz Ltd books